Matthew Aubrey (born 4 June 1997) is a Welsh rugby union player who plays for the Ospreys as a scrum-half. He was a Wales under-18 international.

Aubrey made his debut for the Ospreys in 2013 having previously played for the club's academy and Swansea RFC. 

In March of 2022, Aubrey and team mate Callum Carson were suspended by the Ospreys indefinitely for an incident involving a sleeping homeless man. They were also ordered to volunteer at Wallich Swansea, a local homeless charity to attempt to atone for their actions.

References

External links 
Ospreys Player Profile

Rugby union players from Swansea
Welsh rugby union players
Ospreys (rugby union) players
Living people
1997 births
Rugby union scrum-halves